{|

{{Infobox ship career
|Hide header=
|Ship country=
|Ship flag=
|Ship name=HMS 'Ranger|Ship ordered=7 February 1894
|Ship awarded=
|Ship builder=Hawthorn Leslie, Hebburn
|Ship laid down=17 September 1894
|Ship launched=4 October 1895
|Ship christened=
|Ship acquired=
|Ship commissioned=June 1896
|Ship recommissioned=
|Ship decommissioned=
|Ship in service=
|Ship out of service=
|Ship renamed=
|Ship reclassified=
|Ship refit=
|Ship captured=
|Ship struck=
|Ship reinstated=
|Ship fate=Sold for scrap on 20 May 1920
|Ship homeport=
}}

|}

HMS Ranger was a "twenty-seven knotter" torpedo boat destroyer of the British Royal Navy. Built by the Tyneside shipbuilder Hawthorn Leslie, Opossum was one of three destroyers built by Hawthorns that were ordered in 1894. She was launched in 1895 and completed in 1896. She remained in service during the First World War, where she was used for local patrol duties. She was sold for scrap in 1920.

Design and construction
Displacement was  light and  full load. Armament consisted of a single QF 12 pounder 12 cwt gun and three 6-pounder guns, with two 18 inch (450 mm) torpedo tubes. One of the torpedo tubes could be removed to accommodate a further two six-pounders. The ship's crew was 53 officers and men.

On 17 September 1895, Ranger was laid down as Yard Number 327 at Hawthorn Leslie's Hebburn, Tyneside shipyard, and was launched on 4 October 1895. The ship reached a speed of  during sea trials, and was completed in June 1896.

Service
In July 1896 Ranger was in reserve at Chatham. On 26 June 1897, Ranger took part in the naval review at Spithead to celebrate the Golden Jubilee of Queen Victoria. In 1901, Ranger was based at Portsmouth. Lieutenant Spencer Reginald Strettell Richards was appointed in command on 29 November 1902. In 1905, Ranger was one of a number of old destroyers which the Rear Admiral (Destroyers) condemned as being "..all worn out", with "every shilling spent on these old 27-knotters is a waste of money". He recommended that they be withdrawn from flotilla use and used either as tenders to training schools, or as local defence torpedo boats, or disposed of.

On 2 July 1908, during the annual Naval Manoeuvres, Ranger was steaming in company with the cruiser  in thick fog near the Outer Dowsing lightvessel, when the destroyer  collided with her. While Haughtys bow was only slightly twisted, the damage to Ranger was more severe, with her hull holed close to the waterline. The hole was patched with canvas, and Ranger made it to Chatham Dockyard under her own steam. She returned to her flotilla after repair on 14 July. In August 1910, Ranger, now part of the Nore Destroyer Flotilla, was repaired at Sheerness dockyard after being damaged by colliding with a pier head at Yarmouth. On 5 November that year, Ranger, now part of the 6th Destroyer Flotilla, ran aground off Selsey Bill, damaging her propellers, so she had to be towed into Portsmouth harbour. In June 1911, Ranger collided with the pleasure steamer King Edward at the entrance to Torquay harbour. Ranger was holed below the waterline and was brought into Devonport Dockyard for repair by the battleship .

On 30 August 1912 the Admiralty directed all destroyers were to be grouped into classes designated by letters based on contract speed and appearance.

By March 1913, Ranger was not part of an active flotilla, but was attached as a tender to the shore establishment  at Devonport, with a nucleus crew, but by May that year was listed as for sale at Devonport.

The outbreak of the First World War stopped the sale of the ship, and by March 1915, Ranger was listed as part of the Seventh Destroyer Flotilla, a patrol flotilla based on the East coast of Britain. By April, however, she was part of the Local Defence Flotilla at Portsmouth. Ranger was still part of the Portsmouth Local Defence Flotilla in January 1917, but by March that year, was no longer listed as being part of that unit.Ranger'' was sold for scrap on 20 May 1920.

Pennant numbers

References

Notes

Citations

Bibliography
 
 
 
 
 
 
 
 
 

Ships built on the River Tyne
1895 ships
A-class destroyers (1913)
Sunfish-class destroyers